Sara Sidle is a fictional character portrayed by actress Jorja Fox on the CBS crime drama CSI: Crime Scene Investigation and its sequel, CSI: Vegas. Sidle is a forensic scientist and one of the core characters of the show, which revolves around a Crime Scene Investigation team in Clark County, Nevada, that investigates cases in and around Las Vegas. Fox appeared in both the first eight seasons and the final five seasons of the original show as a series regular. She also recurred throughout the ninth and tenth seasons of the series and headlined Immortality alongside Ted Danson. She returned in the sequel CSI: Vegas.

Appearances

Original Tenure 
In each of the original series' first seven seasons, Fox appeared in all but one episode, and then appeared in the first seven episodes of the eighth season before departing the main cast.

Guest star 
During her absence from the main cast, Fox guest starred in twenty episodes.

Return 
Upon rejoining the regular cast in the series' eleventh season, Fox once again appeared in most episodes, including the series finale. She returned in the sequel CSI: Vegas for its first season.

Fictional character biography
Sidle was born on September 16, 1971, in Tomales Bay, an hour and a half north of San Francisco. Her father was an abusive alcoholic and was killed by Sidle's schizophrenic mother in 1984. Afterward, she spent time in the foster care system, which didn't keep her from graduating from high school as valedictorian at age 16. She attended Harvard on a scholarship, moving on to graduate school at the University of California, Berkeley. While at Berkeley, she started a work-study position at the San Francisco Coroner's Office, where she would also audit lectures to keep up with new developments; it was at one of these that she met Gil Grissom.

Some time later, while she was working in San Francisco, Grissom called her because he needed someone outside the Las Vegas team. Sidle went to Las Vegas and helped resolve some Internal Affairs problems within the CSIs while also providing a replacement for Holly Gribbs, who had been shot. Some episodes later, she became a permanent member of the night shift as a CSI Level 3 at the LVPD Criminalistics Bureau, specialising in materials and element analysis. In Season 8, Sidle briefly changed from nights to swing shifts. In the Season 10 premiere, it is revealed she is married to Grissom. In Season 13, Episode 15, she reveals that Grissom had split up with her. However in series finale "Immortality", she and Grissom are reunited.

Character development
Perhaps because of her traumatic childhood, Sidle has demonstrated compassion and empathy for victims of domestic violence, and fury against their abusers. She also has a soft spot for animals, and became a vegetarian after she saw Grissom conduct an experiment on a dead pig. She has also shown a tendency to become very aggressive when under pressure or annoyed, especially in cases involving abused women – such as her arguments with Catherine and Ecklie, and engaging in a heated argument with a man suspected of murdering his wife. In recent years, perhaps because of her mother's schizophrenia, she has been seen to work several cases with a mental health aspect.

In the early years of the show, Sidle is depicted as antisocial. Her hobbies are all work-related (listening to her police scanner and reading forensic journals); and she claims to prefer working with corpses over live people. In a mid-second season episode, she realizes how much she is missing out on and decides to "get a life" outside of work. During season three she dates a paramedic named Hank Pettigrew, but this relationship ends later in the season when she discovered that he had a longtime girlfriend. Later in the third season, she is injured in an explosion in the lab in search of Grissom, at the end of the episode  she decides to ask Grissom to dinner though he turns her down, stating he doesn't know what to do about "this.".

During the fourth and fifth seasons, Sidle seems to be on a downward spiral as her memories of childhood resurface, with cases becoming more difficult for her emotionally. Also, the fact that Grissom decided to promote Nick Stokes instead of Sidle, did not help. Season Four concludes with Sidle being stopped by a traffic cop. Although she is driving under the influence, she is not charged, but Grissom, as her supervisor, is informed of her arrest. He arrives at the station to bring her home, and finally seems to notice her emotional state. Later, in season five, she loses her temper with a domestic abuse suspect and then argues with supervisors Catherine Willows and Conrad Ecklie, which results in her suspension. Following this incident, she admits to Grissom that she has a problem with authority, has chosen emotionally unavailable men (like Grissom), and has a self-destructive streak. Sidle then opens up to him and reveals her family story; it is during this season that she apparently starts bonding with Grissom. During the subsequent seasons (sixth and seventh), after it is revealed that they are in a relationship, she appears to be happier and on a more even keel.

In CSIs eighth season, when Fox decided to leave the show, both she and the writers decided not to kill the character, so as to leave the door open for a possible comeback. Consequently, she becomes severely depressed after being abducted in the season seven finale (she is rescued in the first episode of the new season), and, even though she accepts Grissom's marriage proposal on the season's fourth episode, she shows signs of burnout during the subsequent episodes, breaking down on the season's seventh episode, leaving Las Vegas with only a goodbye letter for Grissom in which she tells him she loves him - also kissing him out of the blue in front of another colleague -  and a good luck note for Ronnie Lake (played by Jessica Lucas). In the letter she states that ever since her father's death she has been living with "ghosts" and that she now needs to go away and deal with them before self-destructing.

In the season eight episode "You Kill Me", Grissom indicates he has talked with her and that she is in San Francisco visiting her mother.

Promos for the season nine premiere announced that actress Jorja Fox would return, and showed her in three clips. However, Sidle left again after the second episode. She appeared again in the final scene of the tenth episode of season nine when she appears to be working on a research team in Costa Rica, where Grissom joins her after leaving CSI. Then they are married.

During the tenth season, Fox returned to CSI on a recurring basis. This recurring role continued until the eleventh season of the show. She is  brought back by Under-Sheriff Ecklie to aid the lab, which has undergone staffing cuts as a result of Warrick's death and the resignation of his replacement, Riley Adams. Adams was revealed to have resigned as a result of Catherine's poor management and lack of teamwork; when Catherine reveals this to Sara, she reminds Catherine that Grissom had Catherine as a number two, prompting the promotion of Nick Stokes to Assistant Supervisor.

Relationships
Sara Sidle's romantic relationships have been largely unsuccessful. In the first season she named a college boyfriend, Ken Fuller, with whom she had an unsatisfactory relationship, also saying that they had joined the Mile high club (Unfriendly Skies). In season seven she mentioned a college boyfriend who cheated on her. It is unclear whether Fuller was also the boyfriend who cheated on her. In the third season she had a casual relationship with Hank Pettigrew, who was an emergency medical technician. He was involved in several of her cases, but they later broke up after she found out Hank had a longtime girlfriend.

During the first seasons, coroner David Phillips, laboratory technician Greg Sanders, and fellow CSI Nick Stokes occasionally flirted with her, but nothing more than friendship resulted from those flirtations.

Gil Grissom
Since CSI'''s first season there were hints that both Sara Sidle and Gil Grissom were interested in each other romantically; in fact, the show's producers initially introduced Sara Sidle as a future love interest for Grissom. However, during the show's first three seasons Grissom flirted with other female characters, and when she asked him out to dinner he rejected her, saying that he didn't know what to do about what was going on between them.

In season four, Grissom's true feelings were revealed in "Butterflied", an episode that centers entirely around Grissom exploring his attraction to Sidle when confronted with a dead woman who bore a striking resemblance to her. In this episode, Grissom admitted that he was unable to risk his career to be with her. In this season Sara Sidle apparently developed a drinking problem, which Grissom acknowledged in the season finale. In the next season, Sidle was suspended for insubordination and told Grissom about her tormented childhood. He refused to fire her and had her working with him in almost every episode from season six and season seven.
It was not until the sixth season finale that it is revealed that Grissom and Sidle have worked through whatever issues they had and are, in fact, a couple. In season eight it was revealed they have been intimately involved for two years. This revelation caused mixed emotions from fans, some of whom see this relationship as CSI "jumping the shark," an attempt to include more drama and romance to the show to compete with the medical drama Grey's Anatomy, which airs in the U.S. at the same time. By resolving the sexual tension between the two characters, critics posited that the show might appeal to some of Grey's younger audience. This has been denied by the writers. In one interview, producer Carol Mendelsohn said that she has never been able to see Grissom with any other character other than Sidle and that this episode was seen by the writers as the right time to reveal the relationship. Jorja Fox and William Petersen have also said that the relationship between their characters is not new.

Throughout season seven the audience saw Grissom and Sidle as a couple, but the relationship was kept secret from the others in the lab until Sidle's abduction by The Miniature Killer in the season finale, during which Grissom reveals to the team that Sara is the only person he's ever loved. In season eight, they become engaged to be married, but this storyline is left inconclusive when Sara leaves Grissom with a note three episodes later."The Case of the Cross-Dressing Carp". David Rambo, Jacqueline Hoyt (writers) & ... (director). CSI. CBS. 2007-10-18. Season 8 Ep. 4.

A Season 8 scene - cut from its intended episode due to time constraints - showed Catherine Willows visiting Grissom's apartment to update him on a case. While he is in his bedroom, she snoops around and finds a woman's dressing robe in his closet. She then notices a photograph of Gil and Sara together on the fridge. When Grissom emerges from his room, she asks him "How long have you and Sara been together?" He tries to make a quick exit but not before she tells him she'd always thought he was a lonely bachelor, to which his response is to laugh and leave.

In the tenth episode of season nine, "One to Go", Grissom is seen walking through a rain forest holding a GPS System that places him in Costa Rica. He spots a bug on a leaf, but continues, eventually arriving at a camp where Sidle is seen taking a picture of a monkey in a tree. Sidle then sees Grissom, who removes his backpack and walks into Sidle's arms and greets her with a passionate kiss.

In "Family Affair", the first episode of Season 10, Sidle returns to work in the laboratory on a temporary basis, revealing that she and Grissom are now married and have been living in Paris while Grissom conducts a seminar at the Sorbonne.

In "The Two Mrs. Grissoms", Sara attends a party for a school for the deaf. She then gets a call from Grissom during a Taiko drum performance. It was revealed that Grissom was in Peru consulting for the government. She then meets Grissom's mother, Betty, and two deaf professors, one of whom ends up dead in a car explosion.

Grissom's mother ends up criticising Sara for not spending much time with Grissom.

At the end of the episode, she is shown talking with Grissom on a webcam, eventually having his mother walk into the office. Grissom then said that he will return to Vegas to have dinner with Sara and his mother.

At the end of "Malice in Wonderland" Grissom sends Sara two plants with a note saying "From Grissom"

Hints of a troubled relationship appear in several episodes in Season 13. In the episode "Forget Me Not" Sara finally reveals that she and Grissom had split up. In the end of the episode, she admitted to Nick and Greg that at the night of the murder she was expecting to see Grissom; Nick even admits that he and everyone else that worked with Grissom liked having them both together to sort of hang on to but realized that if the relationship is over, it's over.

After remaining separated for a number of years, Grissom and Sara are re-united in the series finale Immortality, when a case involving a suicide bomber brings Grissom temporarily back to the Las Vegas crime lab. The series ends with the pair sailing away together into the sunset, their relationship apparently rekindled.

William Petersen has said that what Grissom loves about Sidle is her tenacity. "She's a bulldog. And he always saw that in her. And he always knew that subconsciously the only person who'd be able to give him a second look is someone who's not willing to take the first look for granted." On her side, Jorja Fox has said that "The story of Sara and Grissom is a little like a fable. And most great fables don't really have 100 percent resolution."

Public reaction
Sara Sidle has gained an extensive fan base throughout the years. A romantic relationship between Sidle and her supervisor, Gil Grissom, was hinted at during the first years of the show; but it was only in Season 6 that the relationship was confirmed and then made definitive with Grissom's marriage proposal in Season 8.

Grissom and Sidle's relationship has been the subject of intense debate in the press and on-line forums, between fans of the romantic relationship and those who believe the romance detracts from what was once a show devoted mainly to mysteries and a forensics laboratory.

In early August 2007, upon rumors of Jorja Fox leaving the show, a grassroots campaign started. Thousands of fans donated to the cause, and they had a plane flying over the Universal Studios of Los Angeles weekly on Tuesdays and Thursdays with a "Keep Jorja Fox on CBS" banner for a month. The online forum Your Tax Dollars at Work, which has about 15,000 members and has organized the campaign, created another campaign that includes mailing the show's producers a dollar, so as to keep Fox on the show. By October 5, 2007, more than $3,500 had reportedly been mailed to the Universal Studios from forty-nine countries. The campaign had started less than a week before, on September 29, 2007.

Though the effort garnered media coverage, it was announced in late October, 2007 that Jorja Fox's final appearance as a full cast member would be in the episode Goodbye and Good Luck, which aired on November 15, 2007. Both writers and Fox have said that they believe that Sara Sidle "will be back" sometime in the future. Fox and CSI writer Carol Mendelsohn chose to donate the money sent to the studios to CASA, a national association that supports and promotes court-appointed advocates for abused or neglected children.CSI Files - Fans donate to charity Retrieved on 2008-January 15.

CBS initially confirmed that Jorja Fox would be returning to CSI in the tenth season for the season premiere and four subsequent episodes. Executive producer Carol Mendelsohn has amended that Fox's tenure on the show has been extended indefinitely. CBS states that the season premiere would deal with where life has taken Sara and what brings her back to Las Vegas.

Video games
Jorja Fox voiced Sara Sidle in the first two CSI video games, CSI: Crime Scene Investigation and CSI: Dark Motives. The other two video games, CSI: Hard Evidence and CSI: 3 Dimensions of Murder, were recorded by Kate Savage.CSI: Crime Scene Investigation - Hard Evidence in Imdb.com Retrieved on 2007-10-21. Rachel Robinson voiced Sara in the ninth CSI game, CSI: Fatal Conspiracy.

 Career 

References

Further reading
 Marrinan, Corinne and Parker, Steve, Ultimate CSI: Crime Scene Investigation'' (2006), DK Publishing, Inc.

CSI: Crime Scene Investigation characters
CSI: Vegas
Adoptee characters in television
Fictional characters from San Francisco Bay Area
Fictional Harvard University people
Fictional Las Vegas Police Department detectives
Fictional female scientists
Television characters introduced in 2000
Fictional forensic scientists